The 2020–21 Iran Super League season was the 31st season of the Iranian basketball league.

Regular season

Group A

Group B

Playoffs

1/8 finals

|}

Quarterfinals 

|}

Semifinals 

|}

Final 

|}

Statistical leaders

Imports
The following is the list of imports, which had played for their respective teams at least once, with the returning imports in italics.

References

 Asia Basket
 Iranian Basketball Federation

Iranian Basketball Super League seasons
Iran